The Gaon Digital Chart of Gaon Music Chart is a chart that ranks the best-performing songs in South Korea. The data is collected by the Korea Music Content Association. It consists of a weekly chart, listed from Sunday to Saturday, and a monthly chart.

Weekly charts

Monthly charts

References

External links 
 Gaon Digital Chart 

2012 singles
Korea, South singles
2012 in South Korean music